Swebus Express AB, trading as just Swebus between 2009 and 2018, was one of Sweden's largest long distance coach operators. Swebus had a "seat guarantee" for journeys bought at least 24 hours before departure, meaning it promised to bring in the necessary extra coaches in case of extensive booking on a departure.

Swebus Express' was focused in southern Sweden, with Uppsala and Stockholm in the north, Norrköping, Linköping and Kalmar on the east coast. Malmö and Blekinge in the south and Helsingborg, Halmstad and Gothenburg on the west coast and Jönköping in the middle, and some lines extended to Oslo in Norway and Copenhagen in Denmark. It also offered tickets to Germany via Eurolines and the Czech Republic via Bohemian Lines.

On 2 May 2018 Nobina AB sold Swebus to Flixbus. All buses have been rebranded to Flixbus and the Swebus name is no longer in use.

History
After Swebus was acquired by Stagecoach in October 1996, Swebus' long distance routes were branded as Swebus Express from 21 April 1997. In the beginning it had the same livery as Stagecoach, just with a different logo. A large marketing campaign between April and August, which included free return tickets, led to some routes quintuple their passenger rates in the period. This again led to Swebus ordering 65 14.7-metres coaches to be bodied by Van Hool on Volvo B10M-70B chassis and two Neoplan Megaliner.

On 1 January 1999 the long-distance coach market in Sweden was deregulated, which led to several new Swebus Express routes, including Stockholm - Uppsala - Gävle, Växjö - Jönköping, Västervik - Jönköping, Växjö - Malmö and Kalmar - Karlskrona - Hässleholm - Helsingborg from 25 January 1999.

Swebus was sold to Concordia Bus in late 1999, with the orange stripe from the Stagecoach livery removed, and later the blue and red stripes were softened at the "Z" section. In 2001/2002, Swebus Express was made into a separate operating company, named Swebus Express AB.

Swebus AB was renamed Nobina Sverige AB in December 2009, and Swebus Express started trading as just Swebus, and also received a new logo and an all-white livery.

On 2 May 2018 the company was acquired by FlixBus, and in September 2018 the brand name ceased to be used.

Routes

Former routes 
Some routes were season-specific.

Partner routes

Former routes
This list is not complete.

References

External links

Swebus website

Defunct transport companies of Sweden
Stagecoach Group
Transport companies established in 1997
Transport companies disestablished in 2018
Swedish companies established in 1997
Swedish companies disestablished in 2018